Sajalices is a corregimiento in Chame District, Panamá Oeste Province, Panama with a population of 2,280 as of 2010. Its population as of 1990 was 1,301; its population as of 2000 was 1,825.

References

Corregimientos of Panamá Oeste Province